The Women's 500 m time trial competition at the 2020 UCI Track Cycling World Championships was held on 29 February 2020.

Results

Qualifying
The qualifying was started at 11:00. The top 8 riders qualified for the final.

Final
The final was started at 16:30.

References

Women's 500 m time trial
UCI Track Cycling World Championships – Women's 500 m time trial